Maria Kantsyber (born 21 March 1996) is a Russian professional racing cyclist, who most recently rode for UCI Women's Continental Team . She rode in the women's team pursuit event at the 2017 UCI Track Cycling World Championships.

References

External links
 

1996 births
Living people
Russian female cyclists
Place of birth missing (living people)